Ryan S. Baker (born 1977 in Naperville, Illinois) is professor of education and computer science at the University of Pennsylvania, and also directs the Penn Center for Learning Analytics. He is known for his role in establishing the educational data mining scientific community, for the  Baker Rodrigo Ocumpaugh Monitoring Protocol (BROMP), and for establishing the first automated detector of student disengagement. He was awarded the Educational Research Award for 2018 by the Council of Scientific Society Presidents.

Early life and education
After graduating from the Texas Academy of Mathematics and Science, Baker received a Sc.B. in Computer Science (2000) at Brown University, and his Ph.D. (2005) in Human-Computer Interaction from Carnegie Mellon University's  School of Computer Science. His doctoral advisers were Kenneth Koedinger and Albert T. Corbett.

Career
Baker is tenured Professor in the Graduate School of Education at the University of Pennsylvania. His primary appointment is in the Teaching, Learning, and Leadership Division. He also affiliated with the Department of Computer and Information Science. Prior to joining Penn GSE, Dr. Baker was an associate professor in the Department of Human Development at Teachers College, Columbia University from 2013 to 2016; and an affiliate assistant professor at Worcester Polytechnic Institute from 2013-2017. He also served as the Julius and Rosa Sachs Distinguished Lecturer at Teachers College, Columbia University from 2012-2013.

In addition, Dr. Baker is an editor of Computer-Based Learning in Context, associate Editor of the Journal of Educational Data Mining and the International Journal of Artificial Intelligence and Education. He also is the co-Lead of the Big Data for Education Spoke of the NSF Northeast Big Data Innovation Hub.

Role in Development of Educational Data Mining Field

Baker was Founding President of the International Educational Data Mining Society, and was one of the first (and current) Associate Editors of the Journal of Educational Data Mining. He served as founding Director of the Pittsburgh Science of Learning Center DataShop, at one time the world's largest public repository for educational interaction data.

Baker taught the MOOC Big Data and Education multiple times, on both the Coursera and edX platforms. He also founded the world's first Masters program in Learning analytics.

Research on Automated Detectors

Baker developed automated detectors that make inferences in real-time about students' affect and motivational and meta-cognitive behaviors, including the first automated detector of student disengagement, and work to link these constructs to long-term student achievement. These automated detectors have been embedded into several online learning systems used at scale in the United States, including ASSISTments.

Baker's research to develop automated detectors of engagement also led to the development of  Baker Rodrigo Ocumpaugh Monitoring Protocol (BROMP), a protocol for classroom observation that has been used to study student engagement in a range of settings, including research on traditional classroom practices and informal field education.

Tools for EDM Research

 MOOC Replication Framework (MORF)
 HART (Human Affect Recording Tool)
 Bayesian Knowledge Tracing Brute Force model fitting code 
 Gaming Detector and Off-Task Behavior Detector 
 Models of Guessing and Slipping )
 A'/AUC Code: GUI and code for computing A'/AUC that does not fail for cases where multiple data points have same confidence
 BrightBytes Early Warning System

Collaborations
Baker has co-authored peer-reviewed scientific papers with over 300 other scientists, including Neil Heffernan, Vincent Aleven, Bruce McLaren, Arthur C. Graesser, George Siemens, and Dragan Gasevic leading to him being listed as one of the most collaborative scientists in his field. As of this writing, Baker has around 300 papers, with over 20,000 citations and an h-index over 60.

See also 
Learning Sciences
Educational data mining
Learning Analytics
Kenneth Koedinger
Albert T. Corbett
Neil Heffernan
Vincent Aleven
Bruce McLaren
Arthur C. Graesser
George Siemens
Dragan Gasevic

References 

1977 births
Living people
Carnegie Mellon University alumni
University of Pennsylvania faculty